Ash Grove is an unincorporated community in Lincoln County, Kansas, United States.

History
A post office was opened in Ash Grove in 1916, and remained in operation until it was discontinued in 1944.

Education
The community is served by Sylvan–Lucas USD 299 public school district.

References

Further reading

External links
 Lincoln County maps: Current, Historic, KDOT

Unincorporated communities in Lincoln County, Kansas
Unincorporated communities in Kansas